Palangabad (also Romanized as Palangābād; also known as Qelīchābād) is a village in Palangabad Rural District of Palangabad District, Eshtehard County, Alborz province, Iran. At the 2006 census, its population was 1,026 in 285 families. At the latest census in 2016, the population of the village was 1,012 in 306 households; it is the largest village in its rural district.

References 

Eshtehard County

Populated places in Alborz Province

Populated places in Eshtehard County